Osvaldo Nieves Morales (born March 20, 1980) is a retired male track and field athlete, who competed in the sprints events during his career. He competed for his native country Puerto Rico at the 2000 Summer Olympics, where he was eliminated in the first round of the men's 4x100 metres relay, alongside Jorge Richardson, Rogelio Pizarro and Félix Omar Fernández. Nieves ran the first leg in the race.

Achievements

†: Most probable, but relay team members could not be retrieved.

References
sports-reference

1980 births
Living people
Puerto Rican male sprinters
Athletes (track and field) at the 2000 Summer Olympics
Olympic track and field athletes of Puerto Rico